Shalmaneser I (𒁹𒀭𒁲𒈠𒉡𒊕 mdsál-ma-nu-SAG Salmanu-ašared; 1273–1244 BC or 1265–1235 BC) was a king of Assyria during the Middle Assyrian Empire. Son of Adad-nirari I, he succeeded his father as king in 1265 BC.

According to his annals, discovered at Assur, in his first year he conquered eight countries in the northwest and destroyed the fortress of Arinnu, the dust of which he brought to Assur. In his second year he defeated Shattuara, king of Hanilgalbat (Mitanni), and his Hittite and Ahlamu allies. He incorporated the remains of the Mittanni kingdom as part of one of the Assyrian provinces. Shalmaneser I also claimed to have blinded 14,400 enemy prisoners in one eye. He was one of the first Assyrian kings who was known to deport his defeated enemies to various lands rather than simply slaughtering them all.

He conquered the whole country from Taidu to Irridu, from Mount Kashiar to Eluhat, and from the fortresses of Sudu and Harranu to Carchemish on the Euphrates. He built palaces at Assur and Nineveh, restored the "world-temple" at Assur (Ehursagkurkurra), and founded the city of Kalhu (the biblical Calah/Nimrud). He was succeeded by his son Tukulti-Ninurta I.

Limmu officials by year
Annual limmu officials beginning with the year of accession of Šulmanu-ašared. The list is partly derived from Freydank and McIntyre. The exact order of the earliest limmus is conjectural but the ordering from Šerriya onwards is essentially fixed.

 1274: Adad-šumu-lešir son of Sin-ašared
 1273: Šulmanu-ašared (king)
 1272: Mušabšiu-Šibitti
 1271: Ber-šumu-iddina
 1270: Abi-ili son of Aššur-šumu-lešir
 1269: Aššur-alik-pana
 1268: Adad-Šamši son of Adad-šumu-lešir
 1267: Kidin-Sin son of Adad-teya
 1266: Šerriya (ordering from here onwards is essentially fixed)
 1265: Aššur-kašid
 1264: Aššur-mušabši son of Iddin-Mer
 1263: Aššur-mušabši son of Anu-mušallim
 1262: Qibi-Aššur son of Šamaš-aḫa-iddina
 1261: Aššur-nadin-šume
 1260: Mušallim-Aššur
 1259: Qibi-Aššur son of Ṣilli-Marduk
 1258: Ina-pi-Aššur-lišlim son of Bābu-aḫa-iddina
 1257: Ber-šumu-lešir son of Ete-pi-Tašmete
 1256: Aššur-dammiq son of Abi-ili
 1255: Ber-bel-lite
 1254: Ištar-eriš son of Šulmanu-qarrad
 1253: Lullayu son of Adad-šumu-iddina
 1252: Aššur-ketti-ide son of Abi-ili
 1251: Ekaltayu
 1250: Aššur-daʼissunu son of Ululayu
 1249: Riš-Adad
 1248: Nabu-bela-uṣur
 1247: Usat-Marduk
 1246: Ellil-ašared
 1245: Ittabši-den-Aššur
 1244: Ubru

Notes

References
 Dönbaz, Veysel, and Grant, Frame (1983). "The building activities of Shalmaneser I in Northern Mesopotamia". Annual Review of the Royal Inscriptions of Mesopotamia Project 1 (1983): 1–5.

13th-century BC Assyrian kings
13th-century BC deaths
Year of birth unknown